Heinrich Friedrich Wilhelm Martin Sahm (12 September 1877 – 3 October 1939) was a German lawyer, politician, and diplomat. He was the mayor of Danzig from 1919 and President of the Senate (head of government and chief of state) of the Free City of Danzig under League of Nations mandate from 1920 to 1931. Subsequently, he served as mayor of Berlin until 1935, and joined the Nazi Party in 1933. From 1936 until his death, Sahm served as ambassador of the German Reich in Norway. The younger son of Heinrich Alexander Sahm (1837–1901), a needle maker (manufacturer of needles and pins) and Shopkeeper, and Wilhelmina née Schußmann (1843–1920). The elder brother Johannes (1876–1927) ran a haberdashery shop in his hometown after his parents.

Life and Work 
He studied law and political science in Munich (München), Berlin and Gryfia (Greifswald). In 1900 he passed the referendary exam in Szczecin, and in 1904 the assessor's exam in Berlin. He worked in municipal boards in Szczecin and Magdeburg. In the years 1912-1918 he was the second mayor in Bochum, at the same time in 1915-1918 (by order of the Reich Internal Affairs) he was the director of the office of the president of the police in Warsaw. He dealt with the issue of food supply to the population. After 1918 (mainly for lack of food supplies) he was entered by the Polish authorities on the list of war criminals, which was largely a political and propaganda move (deleted by the Polish side from this list in May 1920 under the influence of the High Commissioner of the League of Nations Reginald Tower and General Commissioner of the Republic of Poland in the Maciej Biesiadecki WMG II). In July 1918, he became the chairman of the congress of representatives of German and Prussian cities. After the death of Heinrich Scholz, he was elected Mayor of Gdansk on February 2, 1919, and after the establishment of the Second WMG, he was elected the first president of the Senate, the highest governing and executive body, the equivalent of the government. While still mayor, on January 24, 1920, he said goodbye to the German troops of the Gdańsk garrison.

Formally non-partisan, however, he was closer to center-right than left-wing groups. His position was indirectly strengthened by party fragmentation in the Volkstag, the Parliament of the 2nd WMG. In 1919 he participated in talks in Paris on the future status of the II WMG. He effectively opposed the plans of transporting General Józef Haller's army to Poland via Gdańsk, fearing that the Polish side would strengthen its influence in the city. In 1924 he received the honorary doctorate Technische Hochschule Danzig, in 1928 the University of Königsberg and in the same year honorary membership in the Senate of the University of Tübingen (Tübingen). In this way, his efforts in maintaining the German character of Gdańsk were also appreciated.

In his activities, he primarily had in mind the interests of the 2nd WMG, which he clearly expressed during a speech in Hamburg in October 1927, when he demanded that the authorities of the Weimar Republic conclude a trade treaty with Poland. He was active in contacts with foreign countries, his trips were aimed at both fostering the growth of trade and emphasizing the distinctiveness of the 2nd WMG. In 1921 and 1930 he paid visits to Warsaw, in 1929 to Moscow and Kharkiv, he participated several dozen times in meetings of the League of Nations in Geneva, where he enjoyed the trust of many diplomats.

Striving to improve the economic situation of the 2nd WMG, he tried to maintain and even deepen Gdańsk's multiple ties with the German state, he sought to increase the independence of the 2nd WMG and weaken the position of the Republic of Poland in it. On many occasions he emphasized the German character of Gdańsk. He was, like almost all Gdańsk Germans, a supporter of a peaceful revision of the Polish-German border and the incorporation of the II WMG area into the German state. He maintained good contacts with the German authorities; one of his chancellors, Hans Luther, was his longtime friend. He also cooperated with the German Ministry of Foreign Affairs (Auswärtiges Amt) and its representative office in the 2nd WMG, especially with the German Consul General, Edmund Freiherr von Therman. However, he was against moves bearing the hallmarks of political adventures.

He enjoyed great prestige among the Germans in Gdańsk and in the 1920s he was the most influential politician in Gdańsk. He was a guarantor of the continuity of the II WMG political line and the stabilization of the local political scene. He was able to cooperate not only with bourgeois parties, but also with the centre-left Senate. Although on December 19, 1928, he was elected president of the Senate for the third time by the Volkstag, but after the parliamentary elections of November 16, 1930, despite the support of national liberals, he had to resign from his position. His concept of a cross-party president was not accepted by, among others, the Nazi Party, and he did not receive support for his plans to strengthen the president's position from other political parties sitting in the Volkstag. He did not accept the offer to become a senator in the 2nd WMG. In the years 1931-1935 he was Mayor of Berlin, he was forced to resign by the Nazi Party. From 1935/1936 to his death he was an envoy of the German Reich in Oslo.

From 1906 he was married to Dorothea (Dora) (June 23, 1883 – February 8, 1964), daughter of Heinrich Rolffs (1846–1932), a Pharmacist from Weidenau (North Rhine-Westphalia) and Szczecin, and Adela née Tiemann (1850–1932) . He had two daughters and two sons: Marianne (1907–1988), whose husband Ulrich-Wilhelm Graf Schwerin von Schwanenfeld (born 1902) was executed in 1944 after the assassination attempt on Adolf Hitler; Gundel, whose husband was a building adviser; Detlef (born 1910), killed in Russia in 1941, and Ulrich (October 13, 1917 Bochum – August 22, 2005 Bodenwerder), raised in Gdańsk, doctor of law, arrested in 1944 by the Gestapo after the assassination attempt on Hitler, later a leading West German diplomat, in 1972–1977 ambassador in Moscow, 1977–1979 in Ankara and until his retirement in 1982 in Geneva.

He is buried together with his wife at the Forest Cemetery (Waldfriedhof) in Dahlem (Berlin) (in 1997 transformed into the Garden-Monument (Gartendenkmal)), there is also a plaque commemorating his son Detlef at the grave. Some of his memories from Gdańsk were published posthumously by the  Herder Institute in Marburg (Erinnerungen aus meinen Danziger Jahren 1919-1930 , Marburg/ Lahn 1958). Due to his height (over 2 m), a floating crane was jokingly named "Long Henry" in his honor, built in 1905, until 1945 functioning in the Gdańsk Schichau Shipyard (now in the museum in Museum of Rostock).

References

Bibliography
 

1877 births
1939 deaths
Mayors of Berlin
Mayors of Gdańsk
Free City of Danzig politicians
Ambassadors of Germany to Norway
People from Anklam
Nazi Party members
20th-century German civil servants
20th-century German diplomats